Stix or STIX may refer to:

People
 Stix Hooper (born 1938), American jazz musician
 Gary Stix, American journalist
 Thomas H. Stix (1924–2001), American physicist
 Christine Stix-Hackl (born 1957), Austrian jurist

Arts and entertainment
 Stix (public art installation), a 2015 work by Christian Moeller
 STIX (video game), a Commodore 64 video game
 Stix, an animated stick character in the video game Bubba 'n' Stix
 The stiX, a British music project
 The Stix, a 2003 album by Jaga Jazzist

Computing
 STIX Fonts project, providing mathematical symbols
 Structured Threat Information eXpression, a structured language for cyber threat intelligence

Other uses
 Stix Baer & Fuller, an American department store chain (1892–1984)
 Stix, Baer and Fuller F.C., an American soccer club (1931–1934)
 Styx or Stix, a river in Greek mythology

See also
 Sticks (disambiguation)
 Styx (disambiguation)